Kalaignar Seithigal is an Indian Television Channel owned by Kalaignar TV (P) Ltd. The channel has an all News format and is broadcast in Tamil.

References

External links 
 Official Website - https://www.kalaignarseithigal.com/ 
Tamil News

Television stations in Chennai
Tamil-language television channels
Foreign television channels broadcasting in the United Kingdom
Direct broadcast satellite services
Indian direct broadcast satellite services